Kent O'Connor (born 5 March 1987 in Brisbane, Australia) is a former soccer player. Born in Australia, he represented Canada at youth level.

Career

Club
O'Connor grew up in Vancouver, British Columbia, where his family was from, and attended the Roman Tulis European Soccer School of Excellence from the age of 7. He played for Canadian amateur side Surrey United, before moving to Germany in 2006 when he signed with TSV 1860 München. After making many appearances for the team's junior side, and a brief stint back home with Toronto FC, he signed for FSV Oggersheim. Later in 2008 O'Connor signed for Eintracht Trier, where he won the Rheinlandpokal.

O'Connor was released by Trier in the summer 2009, and signed with Danish club Brabrand IF. On 4 May 2010, he announced his return to Germany and signed with Dynamo Dresden for two years., but the transfer fell through. He returned to Canada in 2010 to sign with Abbotsford Mariners in the USL Premier Development League, who making his debut against the Victoria Highlanders on 22 May. On 28 July 2010 returned to Germany and signed with SpVgg Weiden of the Regionalliga Süd. He studied Finance at the University of British Columbia and plays besides soccer in the Pacific Coast Soccer League for the Vancouver Thunderbirds.

International
O'Connor has represented Canada at U-20 level. He made his debut on 12 April 2006 in a game against Norway, and was a member of the Canadfian team which played at the 2007 FIFA U-20 World Cup, featuring in the games against Chile and Austria.

References

External links
 

1987 births
Living people
Canadian soccer players
Canadian expatriate soccer players
Association football defenders
Australian expatriate soccer players
Australian soccer players
Naturalized citizens of Canada
SV Eintracht Trier 05 players
FSV Oggersheim players
TSV 1860 Munich II players
Toronto FC players
Fraser Valley Mariners players
USL League Two players
Canada men's youth international soccer players
UBC Thunderbirds soccer players
Brabrand IF players